Linda Lee Fielding Koop (born June 21, 1950) is a former eight-year member of the Dallas City Council and a Republican former two-term state representative from Dallas County, Texas.

Legislative Voting History
In 2015, Linda Koop voted for Joe Straus as speaker of the house. She voted in favor of HB 80, which placed a ban on texting and driving. Koop regularly has voted in favor of bills relating to occupational licensing such as HB 2267 (which would require an anesthesiologist assistant to obtain a license before practicing) and HB 1260 (which would require an occupational license for shrimp loading and off loading). Additionally, Koop voted in favor of HB 486 which would allow school districts to raise taxes without voter approval. Koop also voted in favor of the Garen Amendment of SB 19, which sought to grant special privileges to legislators and legislative staff members by categorizing their communications as confidential, reducing government transparency.

Unseated by 3,181 votes
Koop lost her bid for a third term in the state House in the general election held on November 6, 2018, when Democrats ran strongly in Dallas County. With 26,648 votes (47.2 percent), she was unseated by Democrat Ana-Maria Ramos, who led with 29,829 (52.8 percent).

References

1950 births
Living people
Republican Party members of the Texas House of Representatives
Women state legislators in Texas
Dallas City Council members
Hillcrest High School (Dallas) alumni
Businesspeople from Dallas
Women city councillors in Texas
Activists from Texas
21st-century American politicians
21st-century American women politicians